The PSLV-C53 is the 55th mission of the Polar Satellite Launch Vehicle (PSLV) and 15th mission using PSLV-Core Alone variant. PSLV-C53 is the second dedicated commercial mission of NSIL.

Details 
The PSLV-C53 will be launched in its Core Alone configuration from the Second Launch Pad of the Satish Dhawan Space Centre in Sriharikota, Andhra Pradesh, India. It will carry three primary payloads DS-EO, NeuSAR and SCOOB-1.

DS-EO satellite (365 kg) is an Electro-Optic, multi-spectral satellite with  resolution imaging capability for Defence Science and Technology Agency,Singapore. NeuSAR (155 kg) is first Singaporean small commercial satellite with a SAR payload, which is capable of imaging in day and night and under all weather conditions. SCOOB-I satellite (2.8 kg) is the first satellite in the Student Satellite Series (S-I) student training program by Satellite Research Centre (SaRC) at Singapore's NTU School of Electrical and Electronic Engineering.

PSLV Orbital Experimental Module

The PSLV Orbital Experimental Module (POEM) also known as PS4 Orbital Platform (PS4-OP) utilizes the spent PSLV fourth stage (PS4) to provide a long duration in-orbit platform for hosting payloads. This would be first time that such PS4 based orbital platform would orbit the Earth as an actively stabilized platform post completion of main mission. Attitude stabilization is done using eight Helium based cold gas thrusters and a dedicated NGC system. Previously on PSLV C45 mission the PS4-OP was put in spin-stabilized mode using RCS thrusters of fourth stage.

For power generation and storage, POEM has solar panels mounted around the propellant tank of PS4 and a Li-Ion battery. Additionally four sun sensors, a magnetometer, gyros & NavIC are used for navigation. POEM also has its own telecommand package.

POEM hosts six payloads including two from Indian aerospace start-ups enabled though NSIL and IN-SPACe. Five of those were mentioned in press-kit.

 DSOD-1U Small satellite deployer by Dhruva Space
 ROBI (ROBust Integrating proton fluence metre) by Digantara Research and Technologies
 Software Defined Radio based Telemetry Multi-Media Transmitter (SDRT-MTx) 
 UHF Transmitter
 OP-VIS - Configured with one GVIS and two cameras
POEM is also carrying preamble to the Constitution of India bearing Indian flag.

Launch schedule 
Flight serial 'C53' was earlier assigned to EOS-06/Oceansat-3 satellite from March 2021 to at least April 2022 but was later given to DS-EO campaign.

Launch of PSLV-C53 was launched at 12:32 (UTC) on 30 June 2022 from Second Launch Pad at Satish Dhawan Space Centre, Sriharikota.

References 

Polar Satellite Launch Vehicle
Spacecraft launched by India in 2022
June 2022 events in India
Rocket launches in 2022